A Million is 2009 South Korean thriller film.

Plot
Eight people enter a reality TV show to win  (approximately ) if they survive 7 days in the Australian Outback. But they don't know the game is murderous trap by an insane TV director.

Cast
Shin Mina as Jo Yoo-jin
Park Hae-il as Han Ki-tae
Park Hee-soon as Director Jang 
Lee Min-ki as Park Cheol-hee 
Go Eun-ah as Lee Bo-young
Jung Yu-mi as Kim Ji-eun
Jung Suk-yong as cameraman
Kim Hak-sun as Ha Seung-ho 
Lee Chun-hee as Choi Wook-hwan 
Choi Moo-sung as Detective Kim
 Shin Dong-mi as Professor An

References

External links 
  
 
 
 

2009 films
2000s thriller films
Films set in Australia
South Korean thriller films
Sponge Entertainment films
2000s Korean-language films
Sidus Pictures films
Films about death games
2000s South Korean films